Corjova is a village in Criuleni District, Moldova.

References

Villages of Criuleni District
Populated places on the Dniester